Arkansas Highway 395 (AR 395) is a state highway made up of two sections, both of which are in Fulton County.  The southern segment is a  spur route that begins southwest of Salem and ends at U.S. Route 62 (US 62) / US 412 in Salem.  The northern segment begins on the northeastern side of Salem at Highway 9 and travels north and east to the Missouri state line, where it becomes Missouri Route 17.

Southern segment
Highway 395 begins at a begin/end state maintenance sign southwest of Salem; the highway continues southwest as Byron Road.  From its beginning, the route heads to the northeast towards Salem, along the winding Byron Road.  On the southwestern side of Salem, the highway ends at U.S. 62 / U.S. 412.

Major intersections

Northern segment
Highway 395 reemerges on the northeast side of Salem near the Fulton County Hospital at an intersection with Highway 9.  From Salem it heads north, roughly parallel to the south fork of the Spring River.  It passes through a mix of grassland and forest, with a few houses dotted along the way.  At the small community of Moko, Highway 395 briefly turns to the east before curving back to the north.  At the Missouri state line, the designation ends, but the highway continues as Missouri Route 17.

Major intersections

References

External links

395
Transportation in Fulton County, Arkansas